William Frank Reichart (July 3, 1935 – November 12, 2021) was a Canadian ice hockey forward and Olympian.

Reichart played with Team USA at the 1964 Winter Olympics held in Innsbruck, Austria. He also played for the Rochester Mustangs in the United States Hockey League (USHL), and in the International Hockey League for the Minneapolis Millers, and St. Paul Saints.

In the 1961–62 season, Reichart, Ken Johannson and Herb Brooks formed the highest-scoring forward line in USHL history at the time.

He died in Southern Pines, North Carolina, on November 12, 2021, at the age of 86.

Awards and honours

References

External links

1935 births
2021 deaths
Ice hockey people from Winnipeg
Canadian emigrants to the United States
Ice hockey players at the 1964 Winter Olympics
Olympic ice hockey players of the United States
American men's ice hockey right wingers
North Dakota Fighting Hawks men's ice hockey players
AHCA Division I men's ice hockey All-Americans